"Livin La Pura Vida" is the seventh episode of the thirty-first season of the American animated television series The Simpsons, and the 669th episode overall. It aired in the United States on Fox on November 17, 2019. The writer was Brian Kelley, and the director was Timothy Bailey.

Plot
While Marge picks up Bart from a sleepover at the Van Houten house, Luann invites the Simpson family to their annual trip to Costa Rica. Marge hurries home to propose the trip and the family quickly accepts. Lisa overhears Homer and Marge as they discuss how expensive the trip will get and quickly becomes worried at the cost herself.

At the airport, the Simpsons meet with the Van Houten family, the Hibbert family, Superintendent Chalmers and his daughter Shauna, and Patty and her new girlfriend Evelyn, to go on the vacation. Though Homer tries to be nice to Evelyn for Patty's sake, Evelyn openly disparages him after what she heard about him from Patty. After arriving in Costa Rica, Lisa gets more worried by the expenses of the journey. Meanwhile, Kirk keeps track of all expenses upfront and will split the checks at the end.

At dinner at the Van Houten vacation home, Homer and Evelyn are unable to converse with their significant others and quickly discover they have a lot in common. The next morning, Homer and Evelyn stay at the beach while the rest of the guests shop. However, the group comes back to find the two drunk and sunburned, having let in monkeys who have trashed the entire place. A furious Marge makes Homer promise to behave for the rest of the trip so she can get the perfect photo of them of their vacation.

Homer and Marge snap the perfect photo at a waterfall, but the wave from Evelyn splashing knocks the phone into the water. At dinner, Patty blames a depressed Marge for making Homer reduce her girlfriend to his level. Marge points out how Evelyn ruined everything for her and is a bad influence on Homer because she acts just like him, telling Patty she is "dating a Homer". Patty is horrified and abruptly breaks up with Evelyn that night.

Bart finds Lisa upset and she reveals to him her financial concerns, so Bart suggests they show their parents the expenses in Kirk's book. They sneak into the master bedroom to look for the evidence. Underneath the bed they find what Lisa believes to be rare priceless artifacts, which Lisa believes the Van Houtens are smuggling to pay for their vacation. When she tries to expose this, Kirk tells her off, pointing out that they are just salt and pepper shakers: they were meant to be a gift for the families.

The next morning, the Simpsons decide to leave the trip and are quickly given their bill by Kirk. In revenge for Kirk charging them extra for ruining the trip, the family sneaks back into the bedroom to take the salt and pepper shakers but inadvertently discover a painting of the explorer Kirkedemious Van Houten, who built the house the Van Houtens own, and confront the Van Houtens for making people pay for the trip with their own money while they get to use the house for free. In the middle of the commotion, Marge has a heart to heart with Patty, apologizing for causing her break-up with Evelyn. She tells Patty that while Homer hates her, Evelyn loves her more than anything else in the world. Patty then agrees to reconcile with Evelyn.

Kirk bitterly refunds the families their money back so they can enjoy the vacation like they intended to. Homer wants to go back to the waterfall to retake the perfect photo of him and Marge, but she convinces him that their vacation is not about being perfect, it is about living in the moment, just as a reconciled Patty and Evelyn kiss on the zipline.

Reception
Tony Sokol of Den of Geek gave this episode three stars out of five, stating ""Livin' la Pura Vida" a beach drink without an umbrella. While there is plenty of fodder for a variety of jokes, it is light on the comedy. The country goes unmolested and the only family to get ribbed is the Simpsons, who once again live up to their reputation of not living up to the community standard even when the standards are lowered. The family didn't get into the country club in season 7's "Scenes from the Class Struggle in Springfield," and now they aspire to the Van Houtens. There needs to be more struggle and less class".

Dennis Perkins of The A.V. Club gave this episode a B+, stating "'Livin La Pura Vida' is one of the better recent excursions, though, credited writer Brian Kelley steering the family’s group vacation to the Van Houten’s favorite getaway spot in Costa Rica around the sub-genre’s worst pitfalls, while managing to tell a coherent story from beginning to end. There’s even something of a nifty little mystery in how the seemingly no-more well-off Van Houtens are able to afford their annual multi-family trip, and some above-average character work to address the usually ignored financial stress the Simpsons’ single-episode world traveling would cause".

Brian Kelley received a nomination for the Writers Guild of America Award for Outstanding Writing in Animation at the 72nd Writers Guild of America Awards for his script to this episode.

References

External links

2019 American television episodes
The Simpsons (season 31) episodes
LGBT-related animated television episodes
Costa Rica in fiction
Television episodes about vacationing